This list of ZF transmissions details those automotive transmissions created by the German ZF Friedrichshafen AG engineering company.

There are two fundamental types of motor vehicle transmission:
Manual – the driver has to perform each gear change (i.e., the driver is required to shift gears) and also has a manually operated clutch to shift between gears. 
Automatic – once placed in drive (or any other 'automatic' selector position), it selects the gear ratio dependent on engine speed and load automatically.
Furthermore, they may also be manufactured solely as a gearbox, and use an entirely separate final drive unit (including its differential) – or be supplied as a transaxle, which includes both the gearbox and final drive unit within one housing.

Cars and light vehicles
These may be used in motor cars (automobiles), or light commercial vehicles such as car-derived vans.

Manual transmissions

4-speed longitudinal
S4-12 – Lotus Elite type 14 (optional), Autocars/Reliant Sabra sports
S4-18 – Bedford Van, Opel Blitz Van
4 DS-10 – Transaxle as fitted to the Hanomag F20-F36 and Mercedes L206/L306/L307 FWD Vans
4 DS-10/2 – Transaxle as fitted to the Hanomag F20-F36 and Mercedes L206/L306/L307 FWD Vans

5-speed longitudinal
5 DS 25 – transaxle as fitted to the Ford GT40 MK1 and MK3, De Tomaso Mangusta, De Tomaso Pantera, Maserati Bora, Abarth SE030, Lancia 037, BMW M1, Michelotti Pura
S5D 310Z – as fitted to the BMW E36 M3 3.0
S5D 320Z – as fitted to the BMW E36 328i
S5-16
S5-17
S5-18 – Alfa Romeo Alfa 6, BMW 2002 turbo, Fiat Dino, Fiat 130, Maserati Biturbo, Maserati Quattroporte, Opel Kadett C GTE, Talbot Sunbeam Lotus, Renault Master van
S5-20 – Maserati Mistral, Maserati Sebring, Maserati Mexico, Maserati Quattroporte I, Mercedes-Benz W112 and Mercedes-Benz W113
S5-325 – Aston Martin DB5 DB6, Maserati Ghibli, Iso
S5-24 – Aston Martin DBS, Maserati Quattroporte III
S5-31 – 1990-2006
S5-39 – BMW 3 Series (E46), BMW 5 Series (E39), BMW 7 Series (E38), BMW X5 (E53)
S5-42 – 1987–1995
S5-47 – 1995–1997

6-speed longitudinal
S6-37 – 1998-2015 (BMW 3 Series (E46), 4 Series, 5 Series, 6 Series)
S6-40 – 1989–1996 (Aston Martin Vantage V550, Lotus Carlton/Omega, Chevrolet Corvette, VN Holden Commodore SS Group A)
S6-45 – (Jaguar F-Type V6, BMW 135i/235i/335i) 
S6-53 – 2007-Present – (Alfa Romeo Giulia Quadrifoglio, Jaguar S-Type Diesel, Land Rover Discovery 3/4, BMW 5 series E60 530d)
S6-650 – 1999-2010 (Ford F-Series Super Duty pickup Trucks, GM 2500HD & 3500 pickup trucks)

7-speed longitudinal
S7-45 – Porsche applications (2011-Present)

Automatic transmissions

3-speed auto
3HP12 – longitudinal, first ZF automatic transmission for passenger cars 1965–1977
3HP20 – longitudinal 1967–??
3HP22 – longitudinal 1975–1990
3HP22 – transverse

4-speed auto
4HP14 – transverse 1987–2001
4HP16 – transverse 2004–2008
4HP18 – longitudinal 1987–1998
4HP18 – transverse 1987–1999
4HP20 – transverse 1995–present
4HP22 – longitudinal 1980–2003
4HP24 – longitudinal 1987–2004

5-speed auto
5HP – longitudinal 1990–present

6-speed auto
6HP19 – longitudinal smaller version of 6HP26
6HP21 – longitudinal 2nd generation of 6HP19 2007–???
6HP26 – longitudinal 2000–???
6HP28 – longitudinal 2nd generation of 6HP26 2007–???
6HP32 – longitudinal bigger version of 6HP26
6HP34 – longitudinal 2nd generation of 6HP32 (was planned, but never went into production)

7-speed dual clutch
7DT – longitudinal 2009–Present (two variants of the Porsche PDK dual clutch transmission):
The first variant, the 7DT-45 – used in the 911 Carrera, the 2009 997 Carrera and Carrera S models; the 2009 Cayman and Boxster, along with a higher torque version, the 7DT-70 in the 2010 911 Turbo.
The second variant, the 7DT-75 – is used in the Panamera.

8-speed dual clutch
8DT – longitudinal 2016–present Porsche PDK dual clutch transmission starts in 2016 Panamera Bentley Continental GT (MY2018) gets a version of it as well. Aston Martin Valhalla V6 Hybrid Limited Edition.

8-speed auto
8HP – longitudinal 2008–Present

9-speed auto
9HP – transverse 2013–Present  Range Rover Evoque

CVT
CFT23 – transverse
CFT30 – used in 2005–2007 Ford Five Hundred, Mercury Montego and Ford Freestyle

Heavy vehicles
These are for heavy motor vehicles; such as large goods vehicles (trucks), buses, motorcoaches, agricultural machinery, plant equipment (such as earth movers), or specialist military vehicles such as tanks.

Manual synchromesh transmissions for trucks
TD: Truck transmission with direct drive top gear
TO: Truck transmission with overdrive top gear

5-speed & 6-speed (ZF Ecolite)
ZF S5-35/2 manual transmission
S 5–42
ZF S635
6 S 700 TO
6 S 850 TO
6 S 1000 TO

9-speed (ZF Ecomid)
9 S 1110 TD
9 S 1110 TO
9 S 1310 TO

12-speed & 16-speed (ZF Ecosplit)
12 S 2130 TD
12 S 2330 TD
12 S 2833 TD
16S 221 OD
16 S 1620 TD
16 S 1630 TD
16S 1685 TD
16 S 1820 TO
16 S 1830 TO
16 S 1920 TD
16 S 1930 TD
16 S 2220 TO
16 S 2220 TD
16 S 2230 TO
16 S 2230 TD
16 S 2320 TD
16 S 2330 TD
16 S 2520 TO
16 S 2530 TO
16 S 2730 TO

Manual synchromesh transmissions for tanks

6-speed
SSG 76 Aphon
SSG 77 Aphon

7-speed
AK 7–200

Automatic transmissions

2-speed auto
Busmatic – 1963–1979

Ecomat series

4, 5 or 6-speed with Hydraulic Retarder and Neutral on Vehicle Stop (4/5/6 HP 500/590/600) – 1980–2002
4, 5 or 6-speed with Hydraulic Retarder and Neutral on Vehicle Stop (4/5/6 HP 502/592/602/C) – 1997–2007
5, or 6-speed with Hydraulic Retarder and Neutral on Vehicle Stop (5/6 HP 504C/594C/604C) – 2006–2016

6-speed auto
EcoLife with Hydraulic Retarder – 2006–

12-speed AMT
AS Tronic – automated manual (AMT) with Hydraulic Retarder – 1997–

See also
List of Voith transmissions

Notes

References

External links
ZF.com official ZF Friedrichshafen AG website
ZF-aftermarket.us ZF Genuine spare parts
Dinet.biz Alternative spare parts for ZF gearbox buses

ZF transmissions